The 2020–21 Sacramento State Hornets men's basketball team represented California State University, Sacramento in the 2020–21 NCAA Division I men's basketball season. The Hornets, led by 13th-year head coach Brian Katz played their home games at the Hornets Nest in Sacramento, California as members of the Big Sky Conference. They finished the season 8-12, 5-9 in Big Sky Play to finish in 9th place. They lost in the first round of the Big Sky tournament to Northern Colorado.

Previous season
The Hornets finished the 2019–20 season 16–14, 8–12 in Big Sky play to finish in a tie for seventh place. They received the #9 seed in the Big Sky tournament, and went up against the #8 seed Weber State in the first round, winning 64–52. They were scheduled to face off against top seed Eastern Washington in the quarterfinals, but the remainder of the tournament was cancelled due to the ongoing COVID-19 pandemic.

Roster

Schedule and results

|-
!colspan=12 style=| Regular season

|-
!colspan=12 style=| Big Sky tournament
|-

|-

Source

References

Sacramento State Hornets men's basketball seasons
Sacramento State Hornets
Sacramento State Hornets men's basketball
Sacramento State Hornets men's basketball